Billy Higgins (born 14 August 1945, in Bootle, England) is a British karateka and former kumite competitor. He holds an 8th-degree black belt from the KUGB, was a winner of multiple European championships, and a gold medalist in men's kumite with the British team at the 1975 World Karate Championships in Long Beach, California.

He is currently a karate instructor for the Karate Union of Great Britain.

References

1945 births
Living people
Black British sportspeople
British male karateka
English male karateka
Karate coaches
Martial artists from Liverpool
People from Bootle
Shotokan practitioners
20th-century British people